When Ghost Meets Zombie is a 2019 Singaporean Mandarin-language romantic comedy film directed by Han Yew Kwang. The film tells the story of a male zombie who is forced by a female ghost to join a male pageant competition, in order to fulfil her own pageant dreams. It is released on 14 February 2019 in Singapore, and 18 April 2019 in Malaysia.

The film stars Nathan Hartono and Ferlyn Wong, both playing their first lead roles in their careers.

Synopsis
The film tells the story of a male zombie named Pong who becomes a mechanical and aimless zombie. One day, he meets a free-spirited female ghost named Zhen Zhen. Hilarious drama unfolds when Zhen Zhen possesses Pong to realise her dream of winning a beauty pageant and forces him to join the male pageant competition.

Cast
 Nathan Hartono as Pong
 Ferlyn Wong as Zhen Zhen
 Fann Wong
 Jesseca Liu
 Jeremy Chan
 Gurmit Singh
 Andie Chen
 Kate Pang
 Suhaimi Yusof
 Yvonne Lim 
 Dennis Chew
 Jack Neo

Music
The official theme song, "等" was released Warner Music Singapore's YouTube channel, sung by Nathan and Ferlyn.

References

External links
 
 When Ghost Meets Zombie on Popcorn

2019 films
2019 romantic comedy films
Singaporean romantic comedy films